Nil Gavani Sellathey ( Stop, Watch and Don't Go) is a 2010 Indian Tamil-language thriller film written, directed and produced by Anand Chakravarthy (producer of Vennila Kabadi Kuzhu), which stars himself in lead role alongside Jagan, Lakshmi Nair, Dhansika, Adithyaa Dev and Ramsyy in the lead roles. The film, which is inspired by The Texas Chain Saw Massacre, released on 17 December 2010 with favorable reviews from the critics. It failed to succeed at the box office and was re-released on 25 March 2011 to mixed reviews. The film was dubbed in Telugu as 143 Hyderabad.

Plot

Sam (Anand Chakaravarthy), Jo (Dhaniska), Arun (Ramssy), Priya (Lakshmi Nair) and Milo (Jagan) head to a small village on a pleasure trip. And they reach the place despite a warning that it is not to going to be a nice trip.

As night arrives, what arrives along with it is a series of mysterious experiences. The friends are attacked one after other by an unidentified villain. In the meantime, a police officer too arrives at the village to unravel the mystery.

Cast
 Jagan as Milo
 Anand Chakravarthy as Sam
 Lakshmi Devy as  Priya
 Dhansika as Jo
 Ramsyy as Arun
 Adithyaa Dev as Chinnapaiya
 Kumaravel KS as Police Officer
 Azhagam Perumal

Critical reception
The New Indian Express wrote that "On the positive side, a sedentary first-half notwithstanding, 'Nil...'gathers steam in the latter, and is watchable, at least in parts. Selvaganesh's music score is pleasant on the ears". Behindwoods gave the film a rating of one-and-a-half out of five stars and wrote that "On the whole, Nil Gavani Sellathey is not a badly crafted thriller. It does excite in patches, but is not able to sustain it for long enough intervals to completely grip you".

Soundtrack
Nil Gavani Sellatheys soundtrack is composed by Selvaganesh.

References

External links 
 
 

2010 films
2010s Tamil-language films
Indian slasher films
Indian thriller films
2010 directorial debut films
2010s slasher films